Melissa Lynn Q. Fejeran (born June 17, 1976) is a retired weightlifter from Guam. She placed 15th in the lightweight division at the 2000 Olympics, where she also served as the Olympic flag bearer for Guam.

References

1976 births
Living people
Olympic weightlifters of Guam
Weightlifters at the 2000 Summer Olympics
Guamanian women
Guamanian female weightlifters